Bělčice is a town in Strakonice District in the South Bohemian Region of the Czech Republic. It has about 1,000 inhabitants.

Administrative parts
Villages of Hostišovice, Podruhlí, Tisov, Újezdec, Záhrobí and Závišín are administrative parts of Bělčice.

References

Cities and towns in the Czech Republic
Populated places in Strakonice District